Bivouac Peak is in the northern Teton Range, Grand Teton National Park, Wyoming. Moran Canyon is situated to the south of the mountain and Snowshoe Canyon lies to the north.

References

Mountains of Grand Teton National Park
Mountains of Wyoming
Mountains of Teton County, Wyoming